The Ethiopian Athletics Championships is an annual outdoor track and field competition organised by the Ethiopian Athletics Federation, which serves as the national championship for the sport in Ethiopia. The competition was first held in 1971. Separate annual championship events are held for cross country running, road running and racewalking events.

Events
The competition programme features a total of 34 individual Ethiopian Championship athletics events, 18 for men and 16 for women. For each of the sexes, there are seven track running events, three obstacle events, three jumps, and three throws. Only men compete in the pole vault and hammer throw events. Women's triple jump was added in 1997 and the steeplechase in 2006. The women's 3000 metres was replaced by the 5000 m in 1995 in line with international changes.

Track running
100 metres, 200 metres, 400 metres, 800 metres, 1500 metres, 5000 metres, 10,000 metres
Obstacle events
100 metres hurdles (women only), 110 metres hurdles (men only), 400 metres hurdles, 3000 metres steeplechase
Jumping events
Pole vault (men only), high jump, long jump, triple jump
Throwing events
Shot put, discus throw, javelin throw, hammer throw (men only)

References

 
Athletics competitions in Ethiopia
National athletics competitions
Athletics